Evitts may refer to:

People
Neil Evitts

Communities
Evitts Creek, Maryland, Allegany County

Geography
Evitts Mountain, in Bedford County, Pennsylvania and Allegany County, Maryland
Evitts Creek (North Branch Potomac River), a tributary of the North Branch Potomac River